Coal  is an American reality television series that aired on Spike. The series debuted on March 30, 2011. The series portrayed the real life events on a coal mine in Westchester, West Virginia, and the inherent dangers involved.

The series was later premiered in the UK on November 8, 2011, via the Discovery Channel UK. It featured owner Mike Crowder along with several employees involved in the mining operation.

Episodes

References

2010s American reality television series
2011 American television series debuts
2011 American television series endings
Television series by Original Productions
Spike (TV network) original programming